Underwater Sunshine (Or What We Did on Our Summer Vacation) is the sixth studio album  by American rock band Counting Crows, released on April 10, 2012, on Cooking Vinyl. The album is composed of cover songs, with vocalist Adam Duritz stating, "Sometimes it's great to play someone else's music and try to make it your own. Sometimes it's great just because it's fun."

Produced by both the band and Shawn Dealy, the album includes compositions from the 1960s through to the 2010s, and features songs written by the band's early contemporaries Tender Mercies and Sordid Humor, both of which included members of Counting Crows before the formation of the band.

Background and recording
In March 2009, Counting Crows left Geffen Records, becoming independent recording artists for the first time in eighteen years. The band subsequently decided to record a covers album as their first independent release, with vocalist Adam Duritz noting, "it seemed [like] a good time for it." In April 2011, the band began recording Underwater Sunshine, in Burbank, California, with sound engineer Shawn Dealey co-producing the sessions. Brian Deck, who had previously produced the latter half of the band's previous double album, Saturday Nights & Sunday Mornings (2008), mixed the album. The band collaborated to choose their favorite songs to record.

The band worked on versions of Stereophonics' "Local Boy in the Photograph" and Joe Jackson's "It's Different for Girls" during the recording process; however they were not included in the final track listing. They continued to write original songs while recording the album.

The band commissioned fans to create the album's artwork.

Critical reception

The album received mixed reviews. Hot Press Edwin McFee who wrote that its "spirit of adventure infuses the opus with a sense of fun and excitement." Caroline Sullivan of The Guardian gave the album three out of five stars, remarking that it seems a "waste of energy" to release an album of covers, but a few of the tracks were surprisingly fresh. Writing for Daily Express, Simon Gage called the country rock feel of the album "surprisingly lovely", but gave the effort only three out of five stars. An Associated Press review was particularly positive, highlighting the country influence, saying that it "feels like a comfortable pair of jeans."

Another three star review came from Matt Melis of Consequence of Sound who mentioned the country rock stylings on the songs and remarked that the album "doesn't reward listeners with definitive versions or perfect takes. Rather, it's sprinkled with 'keeper' moments and variations (subtle and not so) on originals that feel just right."

A negative review came from Irish Independents John Meagher, who criticized both the song selection and the performances on the album as bland and no better than the originals.

Track listing
"Untitled (Love Song)" by The Romany Rye (written by Luke MacMaster) – 5:07
"Start Again" by Teenage Fanclub (Norman Blake) – 3:33
"Hospital" by Coby Brown (Coby Brown) – 3:08
"Mercy" by Tender Mercies (Kurt Stevenson, Patrick Winningham, Chris Boesel) – 3:31
"Meet on the Ledge" by Fairport Convention (Richard Thompson) – 3:37
"Like Teenage Gravity" by Kasey Anderson (Kasey Anderson) – 5:10
"Amie" by Pure Prairie League (Craig Fuller) – 4:33
"Coming Around" by Travis (Fran Healy) – 2:59
"Ooh La La" by Faces (Ronnie Lane, Ron Wood) – 4:37
"All My Failures" by Dawes (Taylor Goldsmith) – 4:37
"Return of the Grievous Angel" by Gram Parsons (Gram Parsons, Thomas Stanley Brown) – 4:22
"Four White Stallions" by Tender Mercies (Patrick Winningham, Jeff Trott, Dan Vickrey) – 4:00
"Jumping Jesus" by Sordid Humor (Tom Barnes, Jim Gordon) – 3:04
"You Ain't Goin' Nowhere" by Bob Dylan and The Byrds (Bob Dylan) – 4:19
"The Ballad of El Goodo" by Big Star (Alex Chilton and Chris Bell) – 4:49
iTunes Store bonus tracks
"Borderline" by Madonna (Reggie Lucas) – 4:18
"Girl from the North Country" by Bob Dylan (Dylan) – 5:52

Personnel
Counting Crows
Jim Bogios – drums and percussion; tambourine on "Start Again", "Hospital", "Amie", and "Ooh La La"; backing vocals on "Meet on the Ledge" and "Coming Around"
Dave Bryson – electric guitar on "Hospital", "Like Teenage Gravity", "All My Failures", and "Jumping Jesus"; acoustic guitar on "Mercy", "Meet on the Ledge", "Amie", "Return of the Grievous Angel", "Four White Stallions", and "You Ain't Goin' Nowhere"; twelve-string electric guitar on "Start Again" and "Coming Around"; mandolin on "Untitled (Love Song)"; and banjo on "The Ballad of El Goodo"
Adam Duritz – lead vocals, backing vocals on "Start Again", "Meet on the Ledge", and "The Ballad of El Goodo"
Charlie Gillingham – piano on "Untitled (Love Song)", "Start Again", "Mercy", "Meet on the Ledge", "Like Teenage Gravity", "Ooh La La", "All My Failures", "Return of the Grievous Angel", and "You Ain't Goin' Nowhere"; Hammond B-3 on "Untitled (Love Song)", "Mercy", "Meet on the Ledge", "Like Teenage Gravity", "Coming Around", "All My Failures", and "Four White Stallions"; accordion on "Amie", Mellotron on "Coming Around", Wurlitzer on "Coming Around", backing vocals on "Untitled (Love Song)", "Mercy", "Amie", "All My Failures", and "Jumping Jesus"; string composition on "Hospital", pizzicato strings on "Jumping Jesus", doorbell on "Coming Around"
David Immergluck – mandolin on "Start Again", "Amie", "Return of the Grievous Angel", and "You Ain't Goin' Nowhere"; acoustic guitar on "Like Teenage Gravity", "Ooh La La", "Jumping Jesus", and "The Ballad of El Goodo"; electric guitar on "Untitled (Love Song)", "Meet on the Ledge", and "All My Failures"; bass guitar on "Hospital"; banjo on "Mercy"; twelve-string electric guitar on "Coming Around"; glockenspiel on "Coming Around", pedal steel on "Four White Stallions", baritone electric guitar on "Jumping Jesus", backing vocals on "Start Again", "Hospital", "Meet on the Ledge", "Amie", "Ooh La La", "You Ain't Goin' Nowhere", and "The Ballad of El Goodo"
Millard Powers – bass guitar, upright double bass on "Amie", acoustic guitar on "Hospital", backing vocals on "Coming Around"
Dan Vickrey – electric guitar on "Untitled (Love Song)", "Hospital", "Mercy", "Meet on the Ledge", "Like Teenage Gravity", "Return of the Grievous Angel", "Four White Stallions", "Jumping Jesus", and "You Ain't Goin' Nowhere"; acoustic guitar on "Start Again", "Amie", "Ooh La Lah", and "All My Failures"; banjo on "Coming Around"; acoustic twelve-string guitar on "The Ballad of El Goodo"; backing vocals on "Untitled (Love Song)", "Start Again", "Mercy", "All My Failures", "Return of the Grievous Angel", "Four White Stallions", "Jumping Jesus", "You Ain't Goin' Nowhere", and "The Ballad of El Goodo"

Additional musicians
Leanne Zacharias – cello on "Hospital"

Recording personnel
Dave Bryson – additional engineering, mixing on "Coming Around"
Counting Crows – production
Shawn Dealey – production, recording engineering
Brian Deck – mixing
Richard Dodd – mastering
Brian Dong – recording assistant
Robert Hawes – recording assistant
Josh Rhinehart – package design
Ivan Sciberras – cover concept, cover design
Jorge Velasco – recording assistant

Charts

References

External links

Stream of the album from Paste

2012 albums
Counting Crows albums
Covers albums
Cooking Vinyl albums
Country albums by American artists
Roots rock albums